Pruksa Real Estate Public Company Limited or simply Pruksa Real Estate is one of the largest real estate developers company in Thailand. It has been listed on the Stock Exchange of Thailand. The company was founded on 20 April 1993 and has its headquartered in Bangkok, Thailand.

Pruksa Real Estate focuses on residential houses, townhouse, condominium located in Thailand, Maldives and India.

References

External links
 Official website

Thai brands
Companies based in Bangkok
Companies listed on the Stock Exchange of Thailand
Real estate companies of Thailand